Kristineberg Palace (Kristinebergs Slott) is located in Kristineberg district of  Kungsholmen in Stockholm, Sweden.

History
Kristineberg was built around 1750 for merchant Roland Schröder (1713–1773). The palace was surrounded by parks and the property included a great deal of the surrounding land.  In 1864 the property was bought by the Swedish Freemasonry and additional construction on the palace was made. 
Stockholm City bought the land in 1921 and started building the Kristineberg district.  Today part of the former  palace is used as the site of Kristinebergsskolan  primary school.

References

External links
Kristinebergsskolan   website

 Buildings and structures in Stockholm County